The Galata Bridge is a bridge that spans the Golden Horn in Istanbul, Turkey. From the end of the 19th century in particular, the bridge has featured in Turkish literature, theater, poetry and novels. The current Galata Bridge is just the latest in a series of bridges linking Eminönü in the Fatih district and Karaköy in Beyoğlu since the early 19th century. The current bridge, the fifth on the same site, was built in 1994.

The bridge was named after Galata (the former name for Karaköy) on the northern shore of the Golden Horn.

History
 
The first recorded bridge over the Golden Horn was built during the reign of Justinian the Great in the 6th century, close to the area near the Theodosian Land Walls at the western end of the city.

In 1453, before the Fall of Constantinople, the Turks assembled a mobile bridge by placing their ships side by side across the water, so that their troops could move from one side of the Golden Horn to the other.

In 1502–1503, Sultan Bayezid II solicited plans for a bridge in the current location. However, the ambitious design was not approved by the Sultan.

Another Italian artist, Michelangelo, was also invited to contribute a design but rejected the proposal, and the idea of building a bridge across the Golden Horn was shelved until the 19th century.

In 2001 a small-scale version of Leonardo's bridge design was constructed near Oslo, Norway by the contemporary artist Vebjørn Sand, the first civil engineering project based on a Leonardo sketch ever to be constructed.

Hayratiye bridge 
In the early 19th century, Mahmud II (1808–1839) had a bridge built further up the Golden Horn, between Azapkapı and Unkapanı. This bridge, known as the Hayratiye (Benefaction in English), was opened on September 3, 1836. The project was carried out by Deputy Lord High Admiral Fevzi Ahmet Paşa using the workers and facilities of the naval arsenal at nearby Kasımpaşa.

Cisr-i Cedid bridge 
In 1845 the first Galata Bridge at the mouth of the waterway (i.e. on the current site) was constructed out of wood at the request of the Valide Sultan, the mother of Sultan Abdülmecid (1839–1861). It was known as the Cisr-i Cedid (New Bridge) to distinguish it from the earlier bridge further up the Golden Horn, which became known as the Cisr-i Atik (Old Bridge). The Baedeker's guidebook also referred to it as the Sultan Valideh Bridge  It continued in use for 18 years

On the Karaköy side of the bridge, an inscribed couplet by poet İbrahim Şinasi recorded that the New Bridge was built by Sultan Abdülmecid I who was the first to pass over it. The first to pass below it was the French captain Magnan in his ship the Cygne.

Toll 
For the first three days, crossing the bridge was free. After that, a toll (mürüriye) was paid to the Naval Ministry. Toll-collecting started on November 25, 1845 and the following tolls were collected:
Free: military and law enforcement personnel, fire fighters on duty, clergy,
5 para: pedestrians,
10 para: people with backpacks,
20 para: load-bearing animals,
100 para: horse carriages,
3 para: sheep, goats or other animals

  
Until 31 May 1930, this toll was collected by officials in white uniforms who stood at both ends of the bridge.

The second bridge 
In 1863 this bridge was replaced by a second wooden bridge, built by Ethem Pertev Paşa on the orders of Sultan Abdülaziz (1861–1876) during the infrastructure improvements that preceded Napoleon III's visit to Istanbul.

The third bridge 
In 1870, a contract was signed with a French company, Forges et Chantiers de la Mediteranée for construction of a third bridge, but the outbreak of war between France and Germany delayed the project, which was given instead to the British firm G. Wells in 1872. It was built at a cost of 105,000 gold liras and was used until 1912, when it was towed upstream to replace the old Cisr-i Atik Bridge.

The fourth bridge 
The fourth Galata Bridge (in Turkish usually known as Eski Köprü; lit. "the old bridge") was built in 1912 by the German firm Hüttenwerk Oberhausen AG for 350,000 gold liras. The bridge was made of 12 individual pieces; 2 terrestrial pieces 17 meter in length, 9 pieces around 40 meter in length, and a central piece 66.7 meters in length, which made the bridge moveable. It was a tolled bridge until 1930.

The fourth bridge contained bars and restaurants at its underside. It is usually described as an important place for the development of the modern Turkish rock music, due to it housing the influential bar . Modern Turkish rock bands and singers such as Duman, MFÖ, Şebnem Ferah and Teoman have spent their formative years in Kemancı. 

In 1992 it was badly damaged in a fire and after one week towed up from it's original location. At the time of the fire disaster the fifth and the current bridge was already under construction near the fourth one and the fourth bridge was planned to be decommissioned in the near future. During the towing process one damaged section of the bridge collapsed. The bridge was classified as a cultural heritage of the second degree by the Turkish authorities.

3 pieces of the went missing after the towing. After the repairs the remaining parts of the old bridge was repurposed between Ayvansaray-Hasköy in 2002. From July to October 2012 the bridge was opened for motor vehicles to ease the traffic flow on the Haliç Bridge, which was under renovation. Due to the fact that the bridge was not allowing ferries to pass, disrupting the water circulation and preventing the ongoing cleaning efforts at the Golden Horn the bridge's middle section was towed near the shoreline in 2012. After the second towing the former shops and restaurants were squatted by the homeless and the bridge was left in disrepair. The remaining 50 meter section on the Hasköy/Balat coast was left in disrepair.

The fifth (current) bridge 

The fifth Galata bridge was built by the Turkish construction company STFA just a few meters away from the previous bridge, between Karaköy and Eminönü, and completed in December 1994. It was designed and supervised by GAMB (Göncer Ayalp Engineering Company). Tram tracks running down the middle of it allow the T1 tram to run from Bağcılar, in the western suburbs to Kabataş, a few blocks away from Dolmabahçe Palace.

In 2003 a string of restaurants were added to the underside of the bridge in imitation of the more ramshackle ones that had clung to the underside of the fourth bridge.

Culture
The Galata Bridge has long acted as a symbolic link between the old city of Istanbul, site of the imperial palace and principal religious and secular institutions of the Ottoman Empire, and the modern districts of Beyoğlu, where a large proportion of the inhabitants used to be non-Muslims and where foreign merchants and diplomats lived and worked. As Peyami Safa wrote in his novel, Fatih-Harbiye, a person who went from Fatih to Harbiye via the bridge passed into a different civilisation and culture.

The bridge crops up in most late 19th-century accounts of Constantinople, perhaps most vividly in Edmondo De Amicis's Constantinople in which he describes the colourful array of characters from many races to be seen on it. The bridge also appears in Virginia Woolf's novel Orlando although it did not exist in the 16th century as the book suggests. 

It is sometimes suggested that the card game bridge acquired its name because the British soldiers who invented it used to cross the Galata Bridge on their way to favourite coffeehouses.

In popular culture 
Geert Mak's short book, The Bridge, published in 2008, is entirely devoted to the bridge and the many people who make a living in and around it. Apart from its place in fiction, the Galata Bridge's romantic appearance has made it the subject of many paintings and engravings.

Duman's first album Eski Köprünün Altında and the album's first song Köprüaltı mention the fourth bridge.

See also
 Atatürk Bridge
 Haliç Bridge
 Golden Horn Metro Bridge
 Golden Horn
 Galata Tower

References

External links

 
 
 
 
 
 

Bascule bridges
Bridges in Istanbul
Ottoman bridges in Turkey
Bridges completed in 1994
Golden Horn
Fatih
Beyoğlu
Road bridges in Turkey
Former toll bridges in Turkey
1994 establishments in Turkey